The 2022 OFC Champions League Final was the final match of the 2022 OFC Champions League, the 21st edition of the Oceanian Club Championship, Oceania's premier club football tournament organized by the Oceania Football Confederation (OFC), and the 16th season under the current OFC Champions League name.

The final was contested as a single match between Tahitian team Vénus and New Zealand team Auckland City. The match took place at Ngahue Reserve in Auckland on 17 August 2022.

Auckland City won the final 3–0 for their tenth OFC Champions League title.

Teams
In the following table, finals until 2006 were in the Oceania Club Championship era, since 2007 were in the OFC Champions League era.

Venue
Ngahue Reserve was the venue for the final. This was the first time that the stadium hosted an OFC Champions League final.

Road to the final

Note: In all results below, the score of the finalist is given first (H: home; A: away; N: neutral).

Format
If the match was level at the end of 90 minutes of normal playing time, extra time would be played (two periods of 15 minutes each), where each team would be allowed to make a fourth substitution. If still tied after extra time, the match would be decided by a penalty shoot-out to determine the winners.

Match

Details

References

External links
 

2022
Final
August 2022 sports events in New Zealand
Auckland City FC
2021–22 in New Zealand association football
Association football in Auckland
2020s in Auckland
International association football competitions hosted by New Zealand